Marvin Jones III (born July 9, 1976), also known as Krondon,  is an American rapper and actor from Los Angeles, California. He is a member of the group Strong Arm Steady, along with rappers Phil Da Agony and Mitchy Slick. As an actor Jones portrays the character Tobias Whale in The CW superhero television series Black Lightning, and voices Tombstone in the superhero film Spider-Man: Into the Spider-Verse.

Early life
Jones grew up in South Central, Los Angeles. He is an African American with albinism.

Career

Music career
Strong Arm Steady formed in 2003, and released its debut album Deep Hearted in 2007 followed by the mixtape Gang Mentality, the conceptual album In Search of Stoney Jackson and their most recent installment, Arms & Hammers.

Krondon's debut album, Everything’s Nothing, came out in 2013.

Krondon collaborated with Shafiq Husayn (Sa-Ra Creative Partners) under the group name White Boiz, releasing the 2015 album Neighborhood Wonderful on Stones Throw Records.

Krondon also ghostwrites for other rappers, such as Snoop Dogg, Dr. Dre, and Xzibit.

Personal life

Krondon maintains a friendship with Bishop T. D. Jakes and fellow actor Mahershala Ali

Filmography

Discography

With Strong Arm Steady
2007: Deep Hearted
2010: In Search of Stoney Jackson
2011:  Arms & Hammers
2012: Members Only EP
2012: Stereo Type (EP) (with Statik Selektah)
2012: Stereo Jr (EP) (with Oh No)

Solo Discography
2003: Strong Arm Steady Presents... Krondon – Black Goldmember Vol. 1
2003: Black Goldmember Vol. 2
2010: Let 'Em Live
2013: Everything's Nothing

With Shafiq Husayn (White Boiz)
2015: Neighborhood Wonderful

References

External links

African-American male rappers
Living people
Rappers from Los Angeles
Underground rappers
Songwriters from California
Gangsta rappers
American rappers
West Coast hip hop musicians
1976 births
21st-century American male actors
Male actors from Los Angeles
People with albinism
21st-century American rappers
21st-century American male musicians
Quakers (band) members
African-American songwriters
21st-century African-American musicians
20th-century African-American people
American male songwriters